Commercial banks are 'A' Class Financial Institutions in Nepal. Nepal Bank Limited is the first & oldest Commercial bank in Nepal established in 1937 AD.  Commercial Bank mainly provide facilities to their customer like Deposits, Loans, Letters of Credit, Internet Banking, Mobile Banking, Remittances, Debit cards, credit cards, branchless banking service & ATMs.

Nepal Rastra Bank (NRB) is the central bank of Nepal and is responsible for the regulation and supervision of the financial system in the country. It is also responsible for implementing monetary policy and maintaining financial stability.

List of Commercial Banks (Class A) 
 Kumari Bank (After the merger with Nepal Credit and Commerce Bank)
 Nepal Bank
 Rastriya Banijya Bank
 Agriculture Development Bank
 Nabil Bank (After the acquisition  with Nepal Bangladesh Bank)
 Nepal Investment Mega Bank (After the merger with Mega Bank Nepal Limited)
 Standard Chartered Bank Nepal
 Himalayan Bank (After the merger with Civil Bank Limited)
 Nepal SBI Bank
 Everest Bank
 Prabhu Bank (After the acquisition of Century Bank Limited)
 Laxmi Bank
 Global IME Limited (After the merger with Bank of Kathmandu)
 Citizens Bank International
 Prime Commercial Bank
 NMB Bank Nepal
 NIC Asia Bank
 Siddhartha Bank
 Sanima Bank
 Machhapuchchhre Bank
 Sunrise Bank

References

External Link 

 Nepal Rastra Bank
 List of Bank in Nepal

Banks of Nepal
Lists of companies of Nepal